The PS10 Solar Power Plant, is the world's first commercial concentrating solar power tower operating near Seville, in Andalusia, Spain. The 11 megawatt (MW) solar power tower produces electricity with 624 large movable mirrors called heliostats. It took four years to build and so far has cost €35 million (US$46 million).
PS10 produces about 23,400 megawatt-hours (MW·h) per year, for which it receives €271 (US$360) per MW·h under its power purchase agreement, equating to a revenue of €6.3 million per year.

Suppliers

Specifications
Each of the mirrors has a surface measuring  that concentrates the sun's rays to the top of a 115-meter (377 ft) high, 40-story tower where a solar receiver and a steam turbine are located. The turbine drives a generator, producing electricity.

The PS10 is located 20 km west of Seville (which receives at least nine hours of sunshine 320 days per year, with 15 hours per day in mid summer). The solar receiver at the top of the tower produces saturated steam at 275 °C. The energy conversion efficiency is approximately 17%.

Plans

PS10 is the first of a set of solar power generation plants to be constructed in the same area that will total more than 300 MW by 2013. Power generation will be accomplished using a variety of technologies. The first two power plants to be brought into operation at Sanlúcar la Mayor are the PS10, and Sevilla PV, the largest low concentration system photovoltaic plant in Europe.

300 MW:
Completed and is operating:
 PS10 (10 MW)
 PS20 (20 MW)
 Solnova 1 (50 MW)
 Solnova 3 (50 MW)
 Solnova 4 (50 MW)
total: 180 MW.

Three more plants are planned:
 AZ20 (20 MW)
 Solnova 2 (50 MW)
 Solnova 5 (50 MW)
Total 120 MW.

PS20 and AZ20 are twin 20 MWe tower plants based on the same concept as PS10.

Energy storage
The PS10 solar power tower stores heat in tanks as superheated and pressurized water at 50 bar and 285 °C. The water evaporates and flashes back to steam, releasing energy and reducing the pressure. Storage is for 30 minutes. It is suggested that longer storage is possible, but that has not been proven in an existing power plant. However, there are many considerations for using molten salt as an energy storage medium due to the great capability of storing energy for long periods without substantial losses (see Concentrated solar power). Another possibility is to use a phase-change material as thermal storage where latent heat is used to store energy.

See also

 List of solar thermal power stations
 Renewable energy in the European Union
 Solar power in Spain
 Solar thermal energy
 Solucar

References

External links

 Final technical progress report, for European Union officials (November 2006)
 Power station harnesses Sun's rays
 Description and pictures
 Power tower reflects well on sunny Spain

Solar power stations in Spain
Solar thermal energy
Energy development
Energy in Andalusia